Hyptiotes cavatus, the triangle weaver, is a species of cribellate orb weaver in the family of spiders known as Uloboridae. It is found in the United States and Canada. It uses an unusual hunting technique whereby it tightens up an anchor line of the web whilst waiting for prey. This effectively winds up and compresses the web. When prey touches the web, the spider releases the held anchor line, causing the web (and the spider) to spring forwards 2-3 cm at high speed. This causes up to 4 additional web strands to touch the prey, and the sudden stop when the web reaches the end of its elasticity then winds the prey further into the strands. This process has analogues to the techniques by humans used to power catapults and ballistae.

References

External links

 

Uloboridae
Articles created by Qbugbot
Spiders described in 1847